Neptidopsis is a genus of nymphalid butterflies found in Africa, commonly called false sailers or sailors.

Species
Listed alphabetically:
Neptidopsis fulgurata (Boisduval, 1833) – barred false sailer (East Africa and Madagascar) 
Neptidopsis ophione (Cramer, [1777]) – scalloped false sailer (sub-Saharan Africa)

References

Biblidinae
Nymphalidae genera
Taxa named by Per Olof Christopher Aurivillius